Ronald de Carvalho (May 16, 1893 – February 15, 1935) was a Brazilian poet, writer, politician and diplomat from Rio de Janeiro. A street in Rio is named after him.

Works 

 Luz Gloriosa (1913)
 Pequena História da Literatura Brasileira (1919)
 Poemas e Sonetos (1919)
 Epigramas Irônicos e Sentimentais (1922)
 Toda a América (1926)
 Brazil

Notes

External links 
 Itaucultural biography 
 Bio details, Mundocultural (Brazil) 
 
 

1893 births
1935 deaths
Writers from Rio de Janeiro (city)
20th-century Brazilian male writers
20th-century Brazilian poets
Brazilian male poets
Vargas Era